The Rover was a British boys' story paper which started in 1922. It absorbed Adventure becoming Rover And Adventure in 1961 and The Wizard becoming Rover And Wizard in 1963, and eventually folded in 1973.

It included characters such as Alf Tupper and Matt Braddock, early examples of the "working class hero".

References 

British boys' story papers
Comics magazines published in the United Kingdom
Magazines established in 1922
Magazines disestablished in 1973
1922 establishments in the United Kingdom
1973 disestablishments in the United Kingdom
Defunct magazines published in the United Kingdom